Shahab al-Din ibn ‘Abd al-Karim Qivam al-Nagawri was a 14th-century Persian physician.

Shihab al-Din al-Nagawri composed several medical treatises, including a general handbook composed in 1392 and a short dictionary of drugs. His metrical Persian compendium on therapeutics was written in 1388 and was often known as "Shahab's Medicine" as well as the more formal title Shifa' al-maradh ("The Healing of Disease"). A considerable amount of autobiographical material is contained in this didactic poem, including that al-Nagawri made his living in trade rather than as a physician.

See also
 List of Iranian scientists

References
 C.A. Storey, Persian Literature: A Bio-Bibliographical Survey. Volume II, Part 2: E.Medicine (London: Royal Asiatic Society, 1971), pp 224–225 no 383

14th-century Iranian physicians
People from Amol